Batal Tabagua is the Chairman of the Central Election Commission of the Republic of Abkhazia. He was appointed to the Central Election Commission December 11, 2004 by outgoing president Vladislav Ardzinba and elected Chairman December 14 after his predecessor, Sergei Smyr, had resigned during the crisis that ensued after the October 3 Presidential election. Previously, Tabagua had been Minister for Justice and head of the Ochamchira district administration.

References

1962 births
Living people
Ministers for Justice of Abkhazia
Heads of Ochamchira District